The IMOCA 60 class yacht Hexagon, NZL 8 was designed by Owen Clark Design and launched in 2001 after being made by Southern Ocean Marine in New Zealand. The boat was built for  brother of Whitbread and America Cup fame .

Racing results

References 

2000s sailing yachts
Sailing yachts designed by Owen Clarke Design
Sailing yachts designed by Merfyn Owen
Sailing yachts designed by Allen Clarke
Sailboat types built in New Zealand
Southern Ocean Marine
IMOCA 60